Dirk Baberowski is one of the most successful professional Magic: The Gathering players. He has won three Pro Tours, tying him in second place with Jon Finkel. Two of those victories were won at team Pro Tours with his teammates of Phoenix Foundation, Kai Budde and Marco Blume.

In 2008, Barberowski was voted in the Hall of Fame. He was inducted during the World championship in Memphis.

Career 

Dirk Baberowski qualified for Pro Tour (PT) Chicago due to a 12th place at Grand Prix Zurich on 31 May 1998. PT Chicago on 25–27 September 1998 featured Tempest-Stronghold-Exodus Rochester Draft. Despite being his first PT appearance Baberowksi managed to win the tournament, drafting a green-white deck, widely considered a horrible color combination in that format.

Other than a 2nd-place finish behind teammate Kai Budde at Grand Prix Amsterdam the most of the remaining season consisted of mediocre finishes at professional events. Baberowski managed another 2nd place at the European Championships in Berlin at the end of the season, though. A 63rd place at the World championship in Tokyo sufficed to take home the Rookie of the Year award.

The only notable finish in the next two PT seasons was a top 8 finish, again at a Pro Tour in Chicago. After that Dirk banded up with Kai Budde and Marco Blume to form the team Phoenix Foundation. Together they swept back to back team Pro Tours in New York (2001) and Boston (2002), also winning the Osaka team Master in between. The following season Phoenix Foundation managed another final day appearance in Boston (2003). Phoenix Foundation disbanded thereafter with the members quitting professional Magic.

Accomplishments

Other accomplishments:
 Rookie of the Year 1998–99
 Hall of Fame class 2008 vote leader

References

Year of birth missing (living people)
Living people
German Magic: The Gathering players
People from Salzgitter
Sportspeople from Lower Saxony